Anjum Moudgil (born 5 January 1994) is an Indian sport shooter. She is from Chandigarh and represents Punjab. She is supported by GoSports Foundation through the Rahul Dravid Athlete Mentorship Programme.

Early life
Anjum took up shooting while studying in Sacred Heart Senior Secondary School in Chandigarh. She completed her graduation and post graduation in humanities from DAV College, Chandigarh. She completed her Masters in sports psychology. She is an avid abstract artist and has sold many of her artworks.

She became a Sub Inspector (SI) with Punjab Police, India.

Career
At the ISSF World Championship in Changwon, Anjum Moudgil won a Silver medal in the women's 10m air rifle event.

The 24 years old shooter, shot a total of 248.4 in the eight-women final to open the Indian senior squad's medal account in the prestigious tournament.

2016 
She took 9th Position at the 2016 World Cup, Munich and silver medal in World University Championship. She took gold in South Asian Games.

2017 
She won the silver medal in 10m Air Rifle Sardar Sajjan Singh Sethi Memorial Masters.

2018 
She won a silver medal in the women's 50m Rifle 3 Positions (3P) event at the ISSF World Cup in Mexico. At the Commonwealth Games (CWG) she secured the silver medal, scoring 455.7 points, achieving 151.9 in kneeling and 157.1 in prone. In the qualification round, she broke the CWG Qualifying record by a significant margin. Moudgil scored 589 (196 in kneeling, 199 in prone and 194 in standing).

2019 
On 1 May 2019, Anjum claimed the world number 2 spot in women's 10m Air Rifle ISSF rankings. She was India's No. 1 in Women’s 50m 3P.

Awards
Anjum is one of 19 athletes picked up by the selection committee for the Arjuna Award year 2019.

References

External links
 
 

Living people
1994 births
Indian female sport shooters
Shooters at the 2020 Summer Olympics
Olympic shooters of India
Shooters at the 2018 Commonwealth Games
21st-century Indian women
21st-century Indian people
Commonwealth Games medallists in shooting
Commonwealth Games silver medallists for India
ISSF rifle shooters
Sportspeople from Chandigarh
Shooters at the 2018 Asian Games
Asian Games competitors for India
Panjab University alumni
Recipients of the Arjuna Award
Medallists at the 2018 Commonwealth Games